Chamaeranthemum is a genus of flowering plants belonging to the family Acanthaceae.

Its native range is Central and Tropical America.

Species:

Chamaeranthemum beyrichii 
Chamaeranthemum durandii 
Chamaeranthemum malifolium 
Chamaeranthemum tonduzii 
Chamaeranthemum venosum

References

Acanthaceae
Acanthaceae genera